The Benjamin Franklin-class submarine''' was a group of US ballistic missile submarines that were in Navy service from the 1960s–2000s. The class was an evolutionary development from the earlier  of fleet ballistic missile submarine. Having quieter machinery and other improvements, it is considered a separate class. This class and the James Madison class are combined with the Lafayettes in some references.

Design

The Benjamin Franklin-class submarines were built with the Polaris A-3 ballistic missile, and in the early 1970s were converted to carry the Poseidon C-3 missile.  During the late 1970s and early 1980s, six boats were further modified to carry the Trident I (C-4) missile, along with six James Madison-class boats. These were Benjamin Franklin, Simon Bolivar, George Bancroft, Henry L. Stimson, Francis Scott Key, and Mariano G. Vallejo.

Previous US SSBNs except the George Washington class had equipment similar to the  SSNs.

This class can be distinguished by the fairwater planes' location halfway up the sail; the Lafayettes and James Madisons had the fairwater planes in the upper front portion of the sail.

Two submarines of this class were converted for delivery of up to 66 SEALs or other Special Operations Forces each. Those boats were redesignated special operations attack submarines and given attack submarine (SSN) hull classification symbols. They were equipped with dry deck shelters to accommodate SEAL Delivery Vehicles or other equipment.

Fate
The Benjamin Franklins were decommissioned between 1992 and 2002 due to a combination of SALT II treaty limitations as the  SSBNs entered service, age, and the collapse of the Soviet Union. USS Kamehameha was decommissioned on 2 April 2002, the last ship of the Benjamin Franklin class to be decommissioned.

The sail of George Bancroft is preserved at the Naval Submarine Base King's Bay, Georgia. James K. Polks sail is on display at the National Museum of Nuclear Science & History in Albuquerque, New Mexico. Mariano G. Vallejos sail is preserved at Mare Island, California, where she was built. The sail of Lewis and Clark is on display at the Patriot's Point Maritime Museum in Charleston, South Carolina.

 Boats in class
Submarines of the Benjamin Franklin class:
(Submarines marked with * indicate Trident C-4 ballistic missile conversions.)

 See also 

 41 for Freedom Fleet Ballistic Missile submarines
 Fleet Ballistic Missile
 List of submarines of the United States Navy
 List of submarine classes of the United States Navy

References

Citations

Sources
Gardiner, Robert and Chumbley, Stephen (editors). Conway's All the World's Fighting Ships 1947–1995. Annapolis, USA: Naval Institute Press, 1995. .
Polmar, Norman. The Ships and Aircraft of the U.S. Fleet: Twelfth Edition''. London:Arms and Armour Press, 1981. .
US Naval Vessel Register - List of SSBN BALLISTIC MISSILE SUBMARINE (NUCLEAR-POWERED) Class vessels

External links
 NavSource.org SSBN photo gallery index

Submarine classes
 
 Benjamin Franklin class